Henry Smith House may refer to:
 Henry Smith House (Challis, Idaho), listed on the NRHP in Idaho
Henry W. Smith House, Kokomo, IN, listed on the NRHP in Indiana
Henry H. Smith/J.H. Murphy House, Davenport, IA, NRHP-listed
Henry Clay Smith House, Winston, OR, listed on the NRHP in Oregon
Henry Spencer Smith House, Neenah, WI, listed on the NRHP in Wisconsin

See also
Smith House